"Knock Knock" (stylized in all caps) is a song recorded by South Korea girl group TWICE for their special album Twicecoaster: Lane 2 (2017). The song was released by JYP Entertainment on February 20, 2017, as the album's lead single. It was written by Shim Eun-jee, Lee Woo-min "Collapsedone", and Mayu Wakisaka.

Background and release

On January 18, 2017, it was reported that Twice would be releasing a special album after their concert in Seoul. In early February, Twice officially announced the release of the reissue of Twicecoaster: Lane 1, titled Twicecoaster: Lane 2, on February 20 with a newly recorded track titled "Knock Knock".

Two music video teasers for "Knock Knock" were released on February 17 and 18 at midnight. The first teaser started with the sound of knock which was heard on the ending of the music video for "TT", while the second teaser showed the members dressed in a variety of outfits that flash by in the stop-motion video. The final group image teaser was released on February 19 at midnight. Twice also greeted the fans via Naver V Live for a comeback countdown at 23:30 KST. The music video for "Knock Knock" was officially released the next day in conjunction with the release of the album. It was also released for digital download on various music sites.

Music video
The music video for "Knock Knock" was directed by Naive Creative Production. Stop-motion effect was used in some of the scenes in the video. It earned almost 10 million views on YouTube within 24 hours since its release and set a new record for the fastest K-pop group music video to reach 30 million view count in only 152 hours. It was the most viewed K-pop music video for the first half of 2017, and topped YouTube's Most Popular Music Video in Korea of that year. It also ranked at No. 10 on 2017 YouTube's Top Trend Music Video in Japan.

The music video featured Twice having fun in a slumber party and snowball fight. Producer Park Jin-young, founder of JYP Entertainment, also had a short appearance. The last scene was the same ending as the music video of "TT".

Reception
"Knock Knock" was a commercial success in South Korea. It debuted atop the Gaon Digital Chart for the week ending February 25, 2017, accumulating 319,957 downloads and 7,136,193 streams within its first week of release. The following week, the song dropped to number two on the Gaon Digital Chart, selling 141,204 downloads and gaining 6,965,178 streams. The single additionally peaked at numbers 5 and 15 on the World Digital Song Sales and Japan Hot 100, respectively.

The song ranked at number 16 on Dazed'''s 20 Best K-pop Songs of 2017. "Knock Knock" surpassed 100 million streams in November 2017 and 2,500,000 downloads in September 2019 on Gaon Music Chart.

The song also appears in the movie Spies in Disguise.

Promotion

On February 20, 2017, Twice had a live broadcast on Naver V Live at 20:00 KST to celebrate their comeback with fans. The group talked about the album, the title track "Knock Knock" and its music video, as well as their first solo concert which was held on February 17–19 and Asian tour. They also performed the full choreography of "Knock Knock" for the first time. The next day, Twice recorded their appearance on the February 25 episode of You Hee-yeol's Sketchbook, their first variety show for Twicecoaster: Lane 2. The group's appearance was included in the show's special monthly episodes with the concept "Songs I want to sing for those in their 20s."

On February 23, Twice held their first comeback stage on M Countdown. It was then followed by performances on February 24 to 26 on Music Bank, Show! Music Core and Inkigayo respectively; continued on the March 7 episode of The Show, and Show Champion on the 8th. The group ended their music show promotions on March 12 on Inkigayo.

Japanese version
On February 24, 2017, Twice officially announced that their debut in Japan was set for June 28. They released a compilation album titled #Twice'' which consists of ten songs including both Korean and Japanese-language versions of "Knock Knock". The Japanese lyrics were written by the same lyricists of the original version.

Accolades

Music program awards

Charts

Weekly charts

Year-end charts

See also
List of Gaon Digital Chart number ones of 2017

References

2017 singles
2017 songs
Korean-language songs
JYP Entertainment singles
Bubblegum pop songs
Gaon Digital Chart number-one singles
Twice (group) songs